Jourdan Bobbish and Jacob Kudla were two white American teenagers tortured and murdered in Detroit by two black males, Frederick Young and Felando Hunter, who were sentenced to life in prison without parole in 2015.

Victims
Jacob Kudla, 18, was a student at Schoolcraft College. Jourdan Bobbish, 17, was a high school senior.

Aftermath
When Kudla and Bobbish were reported missing, an area-wide search was mounted. Their bodies were discovered in a vacant parking lot by a waste picker. They were later found to have been unusually brutally murdered.

Details of the murders emerged during the trial. A witness said that she heard the victims begging for their lives, and that the suspects told them they could leave but killed them anyway.

Before being sentenced Young gave a statement to the court saying "I'd like to say sorry to the family of Aiyana Jones, Michael Brown, Eric Garner and I want to apologize for them for not being able to get justice for their loved ones who were murdered in cold blood and in respect for the peaceful protest I want to say hands up, don't shoot, black lives matter." Video of his statement went viral.

Hunter had already been sentenced to life in prison without parole for the unrelated August 2012 murder of John Villneff, a military veteran, on Rutland Street in Detroit.

See also 
 List of homicides in Michigan
Crime in Detroit

References

External links
Jourdan Bobbish and Jacob Kudla on Facebook

2012 murders in the United States
July 2012 crimes in the United States
2012 in Michigan
Torture in the United States
Attacks in the United States in 2012
Deaths by person in Michigan
People murdered in Michigan
Crimes in Detroit
History of Detroit
2015 in Michigan
Victims of serial killers